Deborah Joy Imani Winans (born September 6, 1983) is an American actress and singer, and member of the musical Winans family. She starred as Charity Greenleaf-Satterlee in the Oprah Winfrey Network drama series, Greenleaf.

Life and career
Winans was born in Detroit, Michigan, the daughter of Carvin and Deborah Kerr Winans. She graduated with a BFA degree from  Wayne State University. She spent a month in Moscow at the Moscow Art Theatre School for additional training, and received an MFA degree in acting from the California Institute of the Arts. In 2014, she began her acting career appearing in Fragile World, a small film. Later she was cast as her aunt CeCe Winans in the Lifetime television biographical film Whitney, directed by Angela Bassett. Winans later made her stage debut in the musical Born for This: The BeBe Winans Story.

In 2015, Winans was cast in a series regular role in the Oprah Winfrey Network drama series, Greenleaf. She plays Charity Greenleaf-Satterlee, the youngest daughter in the family, who is also the Minister of Music. The series also stars Lynn Whitfield, Keith David, Merle Dandridge, and Kim Hawthorne.

Winans welcomed her first child, son Terrence David Williams, with husband Terrence Williams in October, 2021.

Filmography

References

External links 
 

Living people
American television actresses
Actresses from Detroit
21st-century American actresses
21st-century American women singers
African-American actresses
Wayne State University alumni
Musicians from Detroit
1983 births
California Institute of the Arts alumni
American stage actresses
21st-century American singers
20th-century African-American women singers
21st-century African-American women singers